These are the results for the 38th edition of the Ronde van Nederland cycling race, which was held from August 25 to August 29, 1998. The race started in Naaldwijk (South Holland) and finished in Landgraaf (Limburg).

Stages

25-08-1998: Naaldwijk-Hoorn, 178.1 km

26-08-1998: Harlingen-Leeuwarden, 197 km

27-08-1998: Leeuwarden-Groningen, 83 km

27-08-1998: Groningen-Groningen (Time Trial), 25.7 km

28-08-1998: Zwolle-Venray, 179.2 km

29-08-1998: Venray-Landgraaf, 237 km

Final classification

External links
Wielersite Results

Ronde van Nederland
1998 in road cycling
Ronde